Johanna Jussinniemi (born 13 September 1976), better known by her stage name Puma Swede, is a Swedish pornographic actress and feature dancer. The first part of her stage name comes from the sports car, the Ford Puma. Since 2005, she has appeared in over 200 movies.

Biography 
She was born in Sweden of Finnish descent; both her parents were Finns, and she has resided in California since 2004. She worked as a computer sales representative in Sweden and later on as a glamour model before moving into adult films. She initially only performed in girl–girl scenes, but made her hardcore boy–girl debut in the 2005 video School of Hardcore by the studio AntiInnocence Video, with whom she was previously a contract performer.

She received a 2009 AVN Award nomination for Web Starlet of the Year, and a 2009 XBiz Award nomination for Web Babe/Starlet of the Year. In 2010, she made her first mainstream film appearance, a cameo in the comedy The 41-Year-Old Virgin Who Knocked Up Sarah Marshall and Felt Superbad About It with comedian/actor Bryan Callen, formerly of MADtv fame.

In October 2012, she released her autobiography published by Lind & Co. The autobiography tells the cautious tale of her life paying specific attention to her childhood growing up, her introduction into the adult industry and her troubled relationship with and divorce from Sunit Patel.

In 2014, she made an appearance in the third episode of the seventh season of Sons of Anarchy. She makes an appearance as "Skankenstein" in the first film produced by the club's porn studio along with Jenna Jameson. In 2014 she appeared in two episodes of the Swedish reality series Svenska Hollywoodfruar as a friend to Åsa Vesterlund.

She received attention in January 2016 when the newspaper Aftonbladet publicized articles about the Swedish Municipal Workers' Union. People within the union had used the union funds for luxurious dinners and the hiring of Swede to perform a strip show at a restaurant owned by the union, which led to the dismissal of the union cashier.  Many working members cancelled their memberships in the union.

In October 2017, Puma announced that she was opening her first restaurant, "Puma Burger", in Malmö, Sweden. Six months later, the restaurant was sold to other owners and rebranded.

References

External links 

 
 
 
 

Swedish pornographic film actresses
Actresses from Stockholm
Swedish people of Finnish descent
1976 births
Living people
American people of Finnish descent
Swedish female models
Swedish film actresses
Swedish autobiographers
Swedish television personalities
Participants in Swedish reality television series
Swedish female adult models
Women autobiographers
Swedish expatriates in the United States